Mari Hamada 35th Anniversary Live "Gracia" at Budokan is a live video by Japanese singer/songwriter Mari Hamada, released on December 18, 2019 by Victor Entertainment. Recorded live on April 19, 2019 as the final show of Hamada's 35th anniversary Gracia tour, the video marked her first show at the Nippon Budokan since the Return to Myself tour in 1989. Mr. Big bassist Billy Sheehan made a special guest appearance on the show. The concert was originally broadcast on WOWOW on July 27. The video was released on Blu-ray and DVD formats; each packaged with a photobook.

To promote the video, two Tower Records branches in Shinjuku and Osaka displayed costumes worn by Hamada at the show.

The video peaked at No. 9 on Oricon's Blu-ray Disc chart and at No. 7 on Oricon's DVD chart.

Track listing

 Tracks 21–26 released as "Disc 2" on DVD version.

Personnel 
 Takashi Masuzaki (Dimension) – guitar
 ISAO – guitar
 BOH – bass
 Hideki Harasawa – drums
 Takanobu Masuda – keyboards
 Masafumi Nakao – keyboards, sound effects
 ERI (Eri Hamada) – backing vocals
 Zero to Thirty Five Orchestra – strings, percussion
 Billy Sheehan – bass (guest)

Charts

References

External links 
  (Mari Hamada)
  (Victor Entertainment)
 

2019 live albums
2019 video albums
Japanese-language live albums
Live video albums
Mari Hamada video albums
Victor Entertainment live albums
Albums recorded at the Nippon Budokan